Matilda Meech ( 1825 – 10 August 1907) was a New Zealand shopkeeper and businesswoman. She was born in Rochester, Kent, England in  1825. She owned and operated the salt-water baths on the foreshore of Oriental Bay in Wellington between 1885 and 1907. 

In the year 1891, Meech filed suit against Wellington City Council with the allegation of polluting her baths caused by their destructor plant. Later she successfully earned a victory for the case and have secured £200 as the compensation.

She died in 1907 and is buried at Karori Cemetery.

References

1825 births
1907 deaths
New Zealand women in business
English emigrants to New Zealand
19th-century New Zealand businesspeople
19th-century New Zealand businesswomen
Burials at Karori Cemetery